This Is Madness is the second studio album by spoken word recording artists The Last Poets. It was released in 1971 through Douglas Records. Recording sessions took place at Mediasound Studios with production by Alan Douglas and Stefan Bright. The album peaked at #104 on the Billboard 200 albums chart and at #14 on the Top R&B Albums chart in the United States.

It spawned two singles, "O.D." and "True Blues". The songs from This Is Madness were used by various hip hop musicians.

Track listing

Personnel
Jalaluddin Mansur Nuriddin – poet, lead vocals, backing vocals
Umar Bin Hassan – poet, lead vocals, backing vocals
Raymond "Nilaja" Hurrey – percussion
Technical
Alan Douglas – producer
Stefan Bright – producer
Anthony C. Bongiovi – engineering
Bilal Farid – photography
Abdul Mati (Abdul Mati Klarwein) – painting
Bob Vermosa – lettering

Charts

References

External links

1971 albums
The Last Poets albums
1970s spoken word albums
Spoken word albums by American artists
Albums produced by Alan Douglas (record producer)
Albums with cover art by Mati Klarwein